Patchogue-Medford High School (colloquially Pat-Med) is a public high school in Medford, New York, which is located in Suffolk County on Long Island, in the United States.  The school is part of Patchogue-Medford School District. The campus was renamed "Navy (SEAL) LT Michael P. Murphy Campus" after the US NAVY SEAL, Michael P. Murphy.

Academics
According to 2007 data, 89.9% of Patchogue-Medford graduates earn a New York State Regent's diploma.  48% percent of graduates plan to attend 4 year college, and 33.6% plan to attend a two-year college, such as nearby Suffolk County Community College.

Notable alumni
 Kevin Connolly (1992) – Actor, director, and producer
 Biz Markie (1982) – Musician
 Michael P. Murphy (1994) – United States Navy SEAL officer and Medal of Honor recipient
 Paul Regina (1974) – Actor and screenwriter
 Jeff Schaefer (1978) – Professional baseball player
 Renée Felice Smith – Actress, producer, director, and screenwriter
 Paul O'Neill (1975) – Record producer and songwriter
 Marcus Stroman (2009) – Professional baseball player

References

External links
Official site

Public high schools in New York (state)
Brookhaven, New York
Schools in Suffolk County, New York